Digital Archaeology, unveiled in London as part of Internet Week Europe 2010, was described as 'the first ever archaeological dig of the Internet'. The event showcased a selection of groundbreaking websites from the early days of the web, congruously displayed on the hardware and software they were designed on and for.

History
The Digital Archaeology exhibition, organised by Jim Boulton, made its debut at Internet Week Europe 2010. The show celebrates the golden era of the website but more importantly, it seeks to document the formative years of digital culture and raise the profile of web archiving.

The debut exhibition showcased 15 groundbreaking websites and featured a keynote presentation by Helen Hockx-Yu, Web Archiving Programme Manager at The British Library. Such was the level of interest, Boulton was invited to run it again at Internet Week New York 2011 in an expanded format, where it attracted 12,000 visitors. The New York show was sponsored by Google and featured a keynote presentation by Abigail Grotke, Web Archiving Team Lead at the Library of Congress. The event was held again, in a reduced form, as part of Digital Shoreditch 2013, where it was visited by the team at CERN responsible for restoring the first website. 

In 2014, Digital Archaeology featured as a key part of a larger exhibition, called  Digital Revolution debuting at The Barbican and then going on tour to Athens, Istanbul, Stockholm and Beijing.

Its next outing was in 2017 at HereEast, in the Queen Elizabeth Olympic Park. In 2021, it appeared in Cambridge's Grand Arcade in partnership with Raspberry Pi and The Centre for Computing History.

Curator Jim Boulton said of the importance of the event "Today, when almost a quarter of the earth's population is online, this artistic, commercial and social history is being wiped from the face of the earth. Unless we act now to archive our recent digital past, we are in real danger of losing the building blocks of the web that have so shaped modern culture."

Featured websites

The Project - 1991
The Project was the first website to connect and share documents on personal computers via the internet. It was published by Tim Berners-Lee at CERN in 1991 and used HTML 1.0. Its first web address was https://web.archive.org/web/20150717103715/http://info.cern.ch/hypertext/WWW/TheProject.html, which described the WorldWideWeb project.

No screenshots were kept of the very first website. The website featured at Digital Archaeology is believed to be the earliest available copy, from 1992.

Antirom - 1994
The Antirom art collective was formed in London in 1994 as a “protest against ill-conceived point-and-click interfaces grafted onto repurposed old content repackaged as multimedia.” With the radical vision to explore interactivity as a media in its own right rather than as an interface to content, Antirom changed the face of interactive design. The original experiments were funded by a grant from the Arts Council of Great Britain. Design agency Tomato contributed graphically, and the band Underworld provided the music. Developed rapidly by multiple authors, Antirom's interactive experiments often revolved around a single idea, such as sound mixing or scrolling. Although always entertaining, these playful, interactive “toys” could deliberately confound, forcing the user into an active relationship with the media. Built in Director 5 (Shockwave).

Word.com - 1995
Founded by Dan Pelson, Tom Livacarri and Carey Earle in 1995, Word.com was one of the earliest and most influential e-zines. Unlike many web publications of the time, which simply re-created the print magazine format online, Word.com was a true multimedia experience, incorporating games, audio, and chat. Its DIY ethos and first-person conversational style immediately appealed its audience of “underachieving sub-geniuses,” and the site was soon receiving 95,000 page views a day. Its authentic content (notably the Shockwave game SiSSYFiGHT, often cited as one of the earliest examples of massively multiplayer online games) and Yoshi Sodeoka's icon-driven design influenced hundreds of other sites, yet it was never a commercial success. But Word.com was also far from commercially naïve — a pioneer in the use of online advertising, it was the first website to integrate paid content for branded microsites. The site used HTML2.0, Director 5 & RealAudio.

The Blue Dot - 1995
Razorfish became one of the world's most established digital agencies partly because of a bouncing blue dot. Created out of an apartment in the East Village, its homepage utilized the server-push GIF-animation capabilities of Netscape Navigator 1.1 to create the first animated website — crashing many a browser in the process. Razorfish founders Jeffrey Dachis and Craig Kanarick followed this milestone with one of the first online art galleries, The Blue Dot. Created “for our souls” rather than commercial gain, The Blue Dot was a playground of art, design, photography, and provocation, showcasing work by artists like Ryan McGinness, Spencer Tunick, and Jill Greenberg. It notoriously included such delights as “The Society for the Recapture of Virginity” and “Dick for a Day.”

The Blue Dot is now in the permanent collection of the San Francisco Museum of Modern Art. The site used HTML2.0, Director 5 & RealAudio.

CyberOrchids - 1996
Designer, programmer, technologist, artist, professor, author: John Maeda is all of these and more. Now president of the Rhode Island School of Design, the former associate research director of MIT's Media Lab has also enjoyed a long and productive commercial partnership with Japanese cosmetic brand Shiseido. Commissioned to accompany Shiseido's orchid e-commerce service, John Maeda's CyberOrchids, built as a Java applet, was one of the first e-card tools. The site used HTML 2.0, Java.

The Web Stalker - 1997
Webby Award-winner and “the first internet application designed by artists,” The Web Stalker is an experimental browser developed by British web-art activists I/O/D. Working on the principle that the browsers of the day (Netscape Navigator 4.01 and Internet Explorer 3.0) were built to fulfil commercial imperatives determined by advertisers and software corporations rather than the information needs of the individual, The Web Stalker browser stripped out the superfluous, so only the raw text, links, and meta data remained. Built in Director 6.

Noodle Box - 1997
Using Director 6 software, Noodle Box was a series of computer game like interactive experiments. Created by Play/Create and designed by Daniel Brown, the site featured a landscape of building blocks, inspired by the computer games of the 1980s. The site was set apart from many others of its time due to the playful nature of the site. Built in Director 6.

Noodlebox appears in the San Francisco MOMA and the Victoria and Albert Museum (V&A).

Head-space - 1997
The Head-space Project, created and curated by Jason Holland and Felix Velarde and produced by Head New Media, was a collaborative creative space and a spawning ground for multiple interactive projects such as the Brixton-based community website Urban 75 and John Lundberg's CircleMakers.org but was perhaps most famous for the interactive game Slap a Spice Girl. The site used both Director & HTML 3.

K10k - 1997
K10k, also known as “The Designers’ Lunchbox,”  was a global digital design portal. The site was the result of a chance meeting online between Toke Nygaard and Michael Schmidt. Nygaard and Schmidt gained inspiration from sites like DigitalThread.com and Shift.jp.org but wanted to create something that was “fresher and funkier, and updated every single week.”

The site was built by Cuban Council and is built in HTML 4.0.

Less Rain - 1998
Less Rain was founded in 1997 by Vassilios Alexiou and Lars Eberle. The name they chose for their company not only reflects London's temperate climate but also their design philosophy. Clean, natural, playful and unpredictable. Kicking against the vector graphic trend dominating interaction design at the time, their early work had a hand-crafted feel, driven by photography. The first site they designed for themselves, nicknamed Walter The Fish, typified their approach. Walter was a grouper, bought at Billingsgate Fish Market in 1998. Photographed at five stages of consumption, he provided the navigation system for Less Rain's website. Those visiting on fast connection speeds were served the full fish. Slower speeds were offered the bare bones. Built in HTML 3.0, Director 6.0 (Shockwave)

New Beetle - 1998
Founded in 1994, Deepend was one of the first true web design agencies. The Web's slow connection speeds, limited fonts and restricted colour palette deterred most designers. Gary Lockton, David Streek and Simon Waterfall were the exception. While their contemporaries were exploring the technical capabilities of the web, Deepend defined its aesthetic potential. Deepend websites for VW Beetle, Hoover and the Design Museum in ’98, ’99 and 2000 set the standard the rest of the industry aspired to. Incorporating great design, audio, video and games, they pushed the medium way beyond its supposed limits. Built in HTML 3.0, Flash 3.0, QuickTime 3.0

Modern Living - 1998
Starting off life as a comic strip in 1996, Dutchman Han Hoogerbrugge began publishing his Modern Living / Neurotica animations to his website as a series of looping GIFs in ’98. Soon afterward, he progressed to Flash, which introduced an interactive element to his art. Describing his work as an ongoing self-portrait, the central theme of Hoogerbrugge’s work is his battle with modern life. The repetitive, jerky nature of his animations that so accurately reflect his neurosis are actually a result of the bandwidth restrictions of 1998. A 28k modem necessitates the short, low-frame-rate animations he has become famous for. The series concluded in 2001 when the 100th episode was published. Subsequent work includes the non-linear interactive story “Hotel,” developed for the Submarine Channel. The site is built using animated GIFs and Flash 3.

Yugop - 1999
When Yugo Nakamura unveiled his MONO*crafts site at yugop.com in 1999, it made an entire industry stop and draw a breath. One of the first designers to embrace and exploit the potential of ActionScript, Nakamura's interactive environments were very fluid, calming, and natural. Previously a gardener, he quotes an old Japanese saying: “Rather than beautifying one’s own creation, make better the environment that surrounds it” — in other words, better to make a beautiful user experience than a beautiful website. Built in Flash 4.

Jonni Nitro - 1999
In 1999, Jonni Nitro created an animated series centred on a female secret agent on a quest against an unnamed terrorist threat, Tubatomic's G-Woman took its visual cues from graphic novels like Frank Miller's Sin City. Using a highly stylised video-to-vector process, the animated series pushed Flash well beyond its apparent capabilities. Built in Flash 4.

Barneys - 2000
Founded by Peter Kang and Gene Na in 1999, one of Kioken's early websites was for the R & B singer Brandy, and a string of entertainment clients followed, most notably including Jennifer Lopez, Motown, and Bad Boy Records. Criticized by some for a lack of usability, contrary to popular opinion, Kioken was resolute in its belief that audiences raised in the video game era were practiced in deciphering interfaces — in fact, they took pleasure in the experience. Taking their cue from TV and video games, Kioken's websites had a depth and emotional quality absent from their counterparts. Full-bleed images, parallax movement, and floating palettes were used with great effect, all coming together beautifully on Barneys.com. According to Na, it's simple: “You have to think beyond the limits of a page.” Built in Flash 4.

Levi Twisted Denim - 2000
Lateral was founded in 1997 by Jon Bains and Simon Crab. Quickly joined by David Jones and David Hart, they were already digital veterans, having worked at Obsolete since 1994. Their first account was Levi's Europe, an account they retained for a decade. The Levi Twisted Denim site, twists the browser, opening multiple windows and creating a usability nightmare in the process. Bravo to them. Built in HTML 4.01, Director 8.0 (Shockwave), RealPlayer 4.0

PrayStation - 2000
Joshua Davis wanted to write and illustrate children's books. After his first two attempts received two rejection letters, a friend told him, “You don’t need them anymore — there’s this whole internet thing happening. You can self-publish.” Davis went out and bought a book on HTML and changed the face of interactive design forever. PrayStation was Joshua Davis's sketchbook — an experimental personal site of digital exploration, a place where success and failure were all documented, learned from and generously shared. Lessons weren't all that were given away: PrayStation was one of the first sites to provide its source files free. Fueled by his obsessive nature, the site evolved at an astonishing rate, and Davis built a devoted audience and a deserved reputation as an exiting web designer. Built in Flash 4.

MTV2 - 2000
MTV2's BAFTA award-winning website designed by Brad Smith and Mickey Stretton and built by agency Digit and was known for marking the first time the creative started with the web and led the TV and print campaigns. It was built largely in Flash, and exploited multiple 3D-authoring tools like Vecta 3D, 3D Studio Max, and Swift 3D.

The site's styling is draws inspiration from classic first-person shooter games like Doom or Quake, and there are more subtle culture references to classic video games and science-fiction movies throughout. One example being the rise of a faceted block that exits the screen in homage to the Millennium Falcon from Star Wars.

Built in Flash 8, Vectra 3D, 3D Studio Max, Swift 3D.

Requiem for a Dream - 2000
Hi-ReS! leapt onto our screens in 1999 following the launch of their experimental website soulbath.com, “an exhibition of anti-banners.” Twelve million page views later, the site caught the attention of the film director Darren Aronofsky, and he gave founders Alexandra Jugovic and Florian Schmitt their first commercial project, building the website for his new film Requiem for a Dream. Like all Hi-ReS! film websites since, the result is much more than a trailer, it's a cinematic gem in its own right. Requiem for a Dream is about addiction, compulsion, and inevitable descent. The website investigates similar web-based behaviors, particularly online gambling and the “morbid patterns the medium is able to create in its users.” As the user descends deeper into the malfunctioning website, it gradually deteriorates and finally falls apart, ejecting the visitor in its death throes. Built in Flash 4.

Bang & Olufsen - 2000
Bang & Olufsen's first global ecommerce site, created by Large Design, was described by the Financial Times as "the most beautiful site in the world". The site was updated monthly and drove users to store via a series of interactive product demonstrations that recreated the magic of B&O products. The website uses PHP 3, HTML 4.0 and Flash 4.

JAM: Tokyo-London - 2001
Airside was founded in 1998 by Fred Deakin, Nat Hunter and Alex Maclean. The playful style they became known for is perhaps best illustrated by the website they created for the Barbican exhibition JAM: Tokyo-London. The exhibition showcased the work of visual designers from both cities. Airside's website served as both the website for the show and an exhibit in its own right. A crowd of animated characters represented the exhibitors. Clicking on them revealed their work, choosing a discipline highlighted the appropriate characters in an entertaining way. Japanese designers danced on request, fashion designers removed their clothes. The site was nominated for a BAFTA. Built in Director 8.0 (Shockwave), HTML 4.01

Frost Design - 2002
The post dot-com world was a more serious place. Many agencies had gone out of business, those that hadn't, had a decade of experience to perfect their craft. Standards were higher. Born out of the ashes of Deepend in 2001, De-construct was one of the agencies that set those standards. Instead of reinventing communication design, they recognised its solid foundations and built on them. No site expressed this more clearly than the typographically driven site they created for Frost Design. Embraced by the entire design industry, it was this site that convinced many graphic design agencies to take the web more seriously. Built in Flash 5.

Subservient Chicken - 2004
When ad agency Crispin Porter + Bogusky wanted its creation for Burger King brought to life online, it turned to long-term collaborator The Barbarian Group. Its response was to create an interactive video-based site that allowed visitors to control the chicken via their keyboards. Playing on transgressive webcam culture, more than 300 different clips were tagged with all manner of commands, and, a year before YouTube existed and six years before the Tipp-Ex bear, a much-imitated format was born.”. Built in Flash MX.

Vodafone Future Vision - 2004
When Vodafone commissioned North Kingdom to develop a website that depicts a vision of the future of mobile communications, it did so with an open brief. North Kingdom was not only involved with the design and execution of the site, but it also collaborated on what the future might look like. And it did so with remarkable foresight, predicting the prevalence of geo-location technology, electronic paper, foldable screens, tablet devices, and the dominance of touch-screen interfaces, three years before the launch of the iPhone.”. Built in Flash MX.

Gift Mixer 3000 - 2004
A hybrid of HAL 9000 and a mixing deck, Firstborn's Gift Mixer 3000 for Borders is Artificial Intelligence with a sense of humor, a “living, breathing, walking, talking, gift-matching machine.”. Built in Flash MX.

IKEA Dream Kitchens - 2005
Forsman & Bodenfors's groundbreaking website for IKEA consists of six kitchens frozen in time and space. In one, a champagne bottle erupts and the bubbles hang in midair. In another, steam suspends inanimately above a frying pan. As visitors explore the 3D panoramic views of each kitchen, they are treated to Matrix-style special effects. Combining bullet time and kitchens is about as ambitious as it gets. The IKEA Dream Kitchen website is possibly the most awarded website of all time. Built in Flash 8.0

We Feel Fine - 2006
Constantly searching the web for new occurrences of the phrases “I feel” and “I am feeling” and recording the subsequent adjective, We Feel Fine is a barometer for the world's emotions. By categorizing these feelings by the age, gender, and location of the author and beautifully displaying the results as individual colored dots, the site becomes “an artwork authored by everyone.” Are women more emotional than men? Do our feelings change as we age? Are people happier when the sun is shining? Jonathan Harris and Sep Kamvar's We Feel Fine answers these questions through millions of individual stories yet reduces them to a data set, dehumanizing us and humanizing the machine in the process. Built in Java, Perl, Processing.

Agent Provocateur - 2007
Large Design created a series of websites for Agent Provocateur between 2004 and 2007. They were cited in Vogue magazine as being the “sexiest sites on the web.” Starring Maggie Gyllenhaal, the 2007 website was based on one of the most neglected areas of popular culture, the trashy novel. In the early twentieth century, pulp fiction was churned out in every imaginable genre, and their covers and titles were intense, exploitative, sexy, and graphic featuring some of the most provocative imagery of the time. McHarg reimagined this cover art for Agent Provocateur, retaining the intensity but ensuring women were portrayed in positions of strength. In the words of Joe Corré, “The website does more than sell; it’s about telling a story, taking people on a personal adventure.”. Built in Flash 8, HTML 4.01, PHP 3.

Unlimited - 2007
Long-term client Orange approached Poke to communicate the “Unlimited” message it was using to unify its mobile data and broadband offers. Poke's response was to build the world's first never-ending webpage — one that visitors could never reach the bottom of. Even more impressive, the perpetually extending page is a rich collection of animations, mini-games, and interactive toys and appears to never repeat itself. This playful and sharable idea was also provocative, challenging people to try to “beat it,” some resting books on their keyboards overnight in the endeavor. Built in Flash CS3.

HBO Voyeur - 2007
Voyeurism is part of human nature: We are fascinated by other people, and the web has given us the unchecked ability to spy on others without censure. The HBO Voyeur advertising campaign plays on this shared guilty pleasure. Created by BBDO to demonstrate the evolution of the HBO brand across multiple platforms, the campaign consisted of a four-minute film projected onto the side of an apartment block in New York and original content distributed across the social web. All held together by a highly sophisticated website developed by Big Spaceship, this master class in multichannel storytelling was the final nail in the coffin for the stand-alone 30-second ad. Built in Flash CS3.

References

External links
Digital Archaeology website
Internet Week Europe official site
Internet Week New York official site
Digital Archaeology web page on Story Worldwide website
Digital Archaeology YouTube channel

History of the Internet
Defunct websites
Web-related events
Web 1.0